A nabob, an English form of "nawab", is a merchant-leader of high social status and wealth.

Nabob may also refer to:
Nabob (coffee), a brand of coffee in Canada
HMS Nabob (D77), a Bogue-class escort aircraft carrier
Nabob, Wisconsin, an unincorporated community
Nawab, the provincial governor or viceroy in the Mughal empire
The Nabob, a play by the 18th-century English playwright Samuel Foote.

See also
 Nabab (disambiguation)